Andrew J. Natowich (December 11, 1918 – October 30, 2014) was an American football running back in the National Football League for the Washington Redskins. Born in Derby, Connecticut, he played college football at the College of the Holy Cross. He died in a hospital at Brattleboro, Vermont in 2014, aged 95.

References

External links
College of the Holy Cross Hall of Fame

1918 births
2014 deaths
American football running backs
Holy Cross Crusaders football players
People from Derby, Connecticut
American people of Ukrainian descent
Washington Redskins players